The 2017 Jiuzhaigou earthquake occurred on 8 August 2017, in Zhangzha Town, Jiuzhaigou County, Ngawa Prefecture, Sichuan Province, China. The earthquake was registered at  7.0 and killed at least 25 people in the mountainous region of northern Sichuan.

Earthquake

The earthquake struck at 21:19:46 China Standard Time (CST, UTC+8) on 8 August 2017 in Zhangzha Town in Jiuzhaigou County with magnitude 7.0. Cities as far away as Lanzhou, Chengdu and Xi'an felt the quake. The epicenter was 39 kilometres from the county seat of Jiuzhaigou County, 66 kilometres from Songpan County, 83 kilometres from Zhouqu County, 90 kilometres from Zoigê County, 105 kilometres from Longnan City, and 285 kilometres from Chengdu City.

Setting
Northern Sichuan lies in an area with high tectonic activity. In this region, the Tibetan Plateau abuts against the Yangtze Plate with immense pressure forming faults along the edges. Jiuzhaigou County is located in the Min Mountains, a range that was formed at the intersection of these faults. The mountainous areas to the south of Jiuzhaigou County were the epicenter of the 2008 Sichuan earthquake that resulted in tens of thousands of fatalities.

The Jiuzhaigou earthquake did not correlate with any of the known active faults. Field investigation and remote sensing of the surface effects of the earthquake (surface rupture, landslides) permitted the identification of a previously-unknown active fault segment.

Impacts 
According an isoseismal map produced by the China Earthquake Administration, the seismic intensity could be higher than level IX, and the earthquake epicentre in Zhangzha County could reach level VIII.

The earthquake triggered at least 1,883 landslides, most of which were shallow rock slides, debris slides and rock falls that occurred close to the road network.

After the earthquake, the entire Jiuzhaigou County completely suffered a power failure. The eyewitnesses found that some buildings had fallen off in Jiuzhaigou Valley Scenic and Historic Interest Area. The staff of the Jiuzhaigou Valley Scenic and Historic Interest Area told the correspondent from Xinhua News Agency that in the fourth ditch of the Jiuzhaigou Valley Scenic and Historic Interest Area a house had collapsed and cracked, and the locals were stepping up to evacuate people.

Rescue 
The China Earthquake Administration put up a Level I reaction, changing to Level II afterwards, and sent troops to the earthquake area for rescue. At 21:26 CST (UTC+8), Health and Family Planning Commission of Sichuan Province  started an emergency plan, and the medical rescue team was going to head to the earthquake area within one hour.
The Red Cross Society of China, Sichuan Branch was on emergency standby, preparing for rescue. In the small hours the next day, China's State Council Earthquake relief headquarters established national level II earthquake emergency response.

At 06:20 CST on 9 August, a Shuajingsi Town (刷经寺镇) militia vehicle had a traffic collision to a Sichuan F (Deyang) coach in Hongyuan County, Ngawa Prefecture. 3 people from the coach were injured and were being medically treated.

Until 9 August 2017, there were 40 people critically injured, 7 of whom were transferred to other hospitals, 4 to West China Hospital of Sichuan University, and the rest to Jiuzhaigou County Hospital and Zhongzang Hospital.

Casualties 
The Emergency Management Office of the Ngawa Prefecture, Sichuan Province announced that until 13:10 CST on 9 August, the 7.0-magnitude earthquake in Zhangzha Town in Jiuzhaigou County killed 19 people and injured 247 people, including 40 people critically injured. The following day, the death toll rose to 20 with over 400 injured. Deaths and injuries mainly occurred in Zhangzha Town in Jiuzhaigou County.

Aftershocks 

As of 10 August 2017 10:00 CST (UTC+8), 1,741 aftershocks had occurred, including 30 major ones. Some experts predicted that the aftershocks might reach a magnitude of 6 after several days. The major aftershocks reported by China Earthquake Networks Center are listed below:

See also 
 List of earthquakes in 2017
 List of earthquakes in China
 List of earthquakes in Sichuan
 2008 Sichuan earthquake
 2013 Dingxi earthquakes
 2014 Ludian earthquake

Notes

References

External links

2017 disasters in China
2017 earthquakes
August 2017 events in China
Earthquakes in Sichuan